Kuchaluy-e Sofla (also Romanized as Kūchalūy-e Soflá; also known as Kachū-ye Pā'īn and Kachū-ye Soflá) is a village in Qarah Quyun-e Jonubi Rural District, Qarah Quyun District, Showt County, West Azerbaijan Province, Iran. At the 2006 census, its population was 95, in 22 families.

References 

Populated places in Showt County